Pelitli is a village in the Midyat District of Mardin Province in Turkey. The village is populated by Arabs (not Mhallami) and had a population of 311 in 2021.

References 

Villages in Midyat District
Arab settlements in Mardin Province